Mazra, Armenia may refer to:
 Katnarrat, Syunik
 Mets Masrik
 Mutsk
 Pokr Masrik